Xylorycta conistica is a moth in the family Xyloryctidae. It was described by Turner in 1917. It is found in Australia, where it has been recorded from Queensland.

The wingspan is about 29 mm for males and 43 mm for females. The forewings are whitish intimately mixed with fuscous-grey and with fuscous grey marks in the disc at one-third and beyond the middle, sometimes obsolete. There is also a fuscous-grey interrupted terminal line. The hindwings are pale grey.

References

Xylorycta
Moths described in 1917